M.O Mathai (1909 – 28 August 1981), in full Mundapallil Oommen Mathai, was the Private Secretary to India's first Prime Minister Jawaharlal Nehru. He is primarily famed for his memoirs in Reminiscences of the Nehru Age (1978) and My Days with Nehru (1979).

Early life 
Mathai was born to a traditional Marthoma Syrian Christian family in central Travancore.

Career 
Mathai used to work for the United States Army in India, before becoming the Private Secretary to Nehru in 1946. He resigned from his post in 1959, after the Communists accused him of misusing his power to commit financial fraud.

One of Mathai's letters (UO No D/S13170 of 2 December 1954) dug out by the Delhi-based non-profit trust Mission Netaji had become controversial in 2006. The letter indicated that the ashes of Netaji Subhas Chandra Bose were received in India in the 1950s. This information is contradictory to the Indian government's opinion that Bose's ashes are kept in Renkoji temple in Japan.

Books

Reminiscences of the Nehru Age
Mathai wrote the book about his experiences as the private secretary to Jawaharlal Nehru, in the brief span when the Janata alliance ousted Indira Gandhi from the Union Government. The book has a total 49 chapters, some on Nehru's work and personal life and some on the various people that Mathai met.

The book ended up being banned, shortly after publication; the ban was mostly due to his details of the various sexual encounters and affairs the Gandhi family had outside marriage.

Chapter 29 
The chapter 29 named 'She' was blanked and a note was appended in place. The contents of the chapter has since birthed intense speculations. T V Rajeswar, former chief of Intelligence Bureau has since claimed of receiving a copy of the chapter from M. G. Ramachandran and duly submitting to then-Prime Minister Indira Gandhi; he claims to have not read the contents.

Controversy 
The banned chapter contained expose about the multiple affairs Indira Gandhi had with other people and the Gandhi family in general.

References

1909 births
1981 deaths
Writers from Kerala
Malayali people
20th-century Indian biographers
People of the Kingdom of Travancore
Malayalam-language writers
Indian autobiographers